Hoàng Sa is an island district of Da Nang in the South Central Coast region of Vietnam.

In 2009, Vietnam appointed an official, Đặng Công Ngữ, to be the first chairman of Hoàng Sa District. The incumbent is Võ Công Chánh, who was appointed on 5 May 2014. Vietnam does not control any of the islands it claims and the entire Paracel Islands is under the administration of the People's Republic of China as part of Sansha prefecture.

Vietnam established Hoàng Sa district in 1982 as part of Quảng Nam-Da Nang province. Since Quảng Nam and Da Nang were split in November 1996, the island district has belonged to Da Nang.

See also 
 Battle of the Paracel Islands
Paracel Islands

References

Districts of Da Nang
Paracel Islands